Aikakone (Finnish for time machine) is a Finnish pop music group active from 1995 to 1998 and shortly in 2001 and 2003 as Aika. In 2003, they changed their name back to Aikakone and have since been active on and off.

Their debut album Tähtikaaren taa went triple platinum in Finland, the follow-up, Toiseen maailmaan, double platinum, their third, Maa, went platinum, and their fourth album, Hear Me Now, went gold.

Aikakone was awarded the Newcomer of the Year Emma award in 1995. They were also selected the best band of the year in 1995 in a vote on Radiomafia.

Band members
 Sani (Saija Aartela)
 Vera (Heidi Puurula)
 Alex (Alex Ojasti)
 Maki (Marko Kolehmainen)

Heidi Susanna Puurula (born Heidi Vahakallio, October 13, 1971) is a Finnish singer and lyricist. In Aikakone, she did mostly backing vocals, but also some lead vocals in songs such as "Toiseen maailmaan" and "Tulisitko"'. She has also written lyrics for many artists like Kirka, Laura Voutilainen, Heidi Kyrö, and Sani. Her short story "Paratiisi" has been published in the magazine .

Discography

Studio albums

Compilations

Singles

See also
 List of best-selling music artists in Finland

References

External links

Finnish Eurodance groups
Finnish pop music groups
Musical groups established in 1995
Musical groups disestablished in 1998
Musical groups reestablished in 2001
Musical groups disestablished in 2003
Musical groups reestablished in 2008
Bertelsmann Music Group artists